Żeleźniki may refer to the following places in Poland:
Żeleźniki, Lower Silesian Voivodeship (south-west Poland)
Żeleźniki, Masovian Voivodeship (east-central Poland)